Ishielu is a Local Government Area of Ebonyi State, Nigeria. Its headquarters are in the town of Ezillo.
 
It has an area of 872 km and a population of 151,048 at the 2006 census.

The postal code of the area is 481.

References

Local Government Areas in Ebonyi State